This was the first edition of the tournament.

Lu Yen-hsun won the title after defeating Ričardas Berankis 6–3, 6–1 in the final.

Seeds

Draw

Finals

Top half

Bottom half

References
Main Draw
Qualifying Draw

China International Challenger Jinan - Singles
2017 Singles